Russian State Symphony Orchestra may be used of distinct ensembles:

 The State Academic Symphony Orchestra of the Russian Federation (Svetlanov Symphony Orchestra), formerly the much-recorded USSR State Symphony Orchestra
 The State Symphony Capella of Russia, formerly the USSR Ministry of Culture Symphony Orchestra
 The State Symphony Cinema Orchestra, a cinematographic orchestra of Russia